The men's 1952 United States Olympic trials for track and field were held at the Los Angeles Memorial Coliseum in Los Angeles, California, on June 27 and 28.   The 10 kilometer walk trials were held in New York City on June 1, and the 50 kilometer walk trials were held on May 4 in Baltimore, Maryland. Three marathon trials were held between two races, the AAU National Championships in Yonkers, New York for both 1951 and 1952, on May 27, 1951 and May 18, 1952 and the Boston Marathon in Boston, Massachusetts, on April 19.  Victor Dyrgall and Tom Jones finished 1–2 at both 1952 races to win selection.  1951's second placer John Lafferty was selected after finishing fifth in the same race in 1952.  The 10,000 meters was held in Long Beach, California on June 20.  

The decathlon was held a week after the trials on July 1-2 at the hometown track of the defending Olympic champion, Bob Mathias in Tulare, California.

The Women's Olympic trials were held separately in Harrisburg, Pennsylvania on July 1.  The women's events didn't even record non-winning times.  The women threw the American sized 8 Lb. implement.  The process was organized by the AAU.

Men's results
Key:
.

Men track events

Men field events

Women's results

Women track events

Women field events

References

US Olympic Trials
Track, Outdoor
United States Summer Olympics Trials